P. sinica  may refer to:
 Platanthera sinica, an orchid species endemic to the Yunnan Province of China
 Pryeria sinica, the euonymus leaf notcher, a moth species native to Asia